Patrice Dominguez and François Jauffret were the defending champions but lost in the first round to Arthur Ashe and Bob Hewitt.

Wojciech Fibak and Karl Meiler won in the final of the 1975 Paris Open tennis tournament 6–4, 7–6 against Ilie Năstase and Tom Okker.

Seeds
Champion seeds are indicated in bold text while text in italics indicates the round in which those seeds were eliminated. All four seeded teams received byes to the second round.

 Fred McNair /  Sherwood Stewart (quarterfinals)
 Wojciech Fibak /  Karl Meiler (champions)
 Dick Stockton /  Erik van Dillen (quarterfinals)
 Ilie Năstase /  Tom Okker (final)

Draw

Final

Top half

Bottom half

External links
 1975 Paris Open Doubles draw

Doubles